Secrets from the Future is the second studio album from nerdcore hip hop artist MC Frontalot. It was released on tour and through his website on April 6, 2007.

Like his first album, Nerdcore Rising, it is composed mostly of new material but does include two remakes from before Nerdcore Rising ("Gonna Be Your Man" and "Romantic Cheapskate"). The album features extensive references to computer culture and video games. A video has been created for the song "It Is Pitch Dark". The video was directed by Jason Scott Sadofsky, and features a cameo by Steve Meretzky. It was publicly screened for the first time at the 2007 Penny Arcade Expo.

The front cover art for the album was done by Mike Krahulik of the webcomic Penny Arcade. Inside art was done by Jeffrey Rowland, himself famous for a number of webcomics. The track "Livin' at the Corner of Dude & Catastrophe" is about another webcomic, Achewood. The song "Very Poorly Concealed Secret Track" is actually a remix/re-recording of "The Ping Pong Song" by Optimus Rhyme, with MC Frontalot contributing an additional verse.

Track listing

Credits

Additional Musicians
Alec Berlin – guitar
Andrew Griffin – drums
Baddd Spellah - drum programming
Brad "Sucks" Turcotte - guitar, bass, synthesizer, vocals
Brandon "Blak Lotus" Patton – bass guitar
Dan "The Categorical Imperative" Thiel – drums
Daniel "DJ Snyder" Wilkes - scratching
Doug Cheatwood - harmonica
Frankie Big Face - saxophone
Gabriel "Gm7" Alter – keyboard, organ, vocals
Ganda Suthivarakom - vocals
Jess Klein - vocals
Jessica Neighbor - vocals
Optimus Rhyme - vocals
Sam Bigelow - vocals
Sean McPharlin - theremin
Sturgis "The Sturgenius" Cunningham - drums
Whoremoans - vocals

Design
Owen Freeman - tray and disc illustration
Mike Krahulik – cover illustration
Jeffrey Rowland - back cover illustration

References

External links
 Official Secrets from the Future web page with samples and lyrics
 

2007 albums
MC Frontalot albums